Carleton is a hamlet on the A6 road, in the Carlisle district, in the county of Cumbria, England. In the Imperial Gazetteer of England and Wales of 1870-1872 it had a population of 181.

The buildings along the A6 between Junction 42 of the M6 to Barrock Fell including Scalesceugh Hall are all addressed as being part of Carleton.

Garlands Hospital (formerly Cumberland and Westmorland Lunatic Asylum) was based in the village until it closed in 1999.

Location 
It is a few miles to the south-east of the city centre of Carlisle and is near the River Petteril.

Nearby settlements  
Nearby settlements include the city of Carlisle, the residential area (suburb of Carlisle) of Harraby.

History 
The name "Carleton" means "the enclosure or farm of Carl".

See also

Listed buildings in St Cuthbert Without

References

External links
 Cumbria County History Trust: Carlisle : St. Cuthbert Without (nb: provisional research only - see Talk page)

 Carlisle A-Z (page 25)

Hamlets in Cumbria
City of Carlisle